The Alfred Ackermann–Teubner Memorial Award for the Promotion of Mathematical Sciences recognized work in mathematical analysis.  It was established in 1912 by engineer Alfred Ackermann-Teubner (1857–1941), and was an endowment of the University of Leipzig.

It was awarded 14 times between 1914 and 1941. Subsequent awards were to be made every other year until a surplus of 60,000 marks was accumulated within the endowment, at which time, the prize was to be awarded annually. The subjects included:
 History, philosophy, teaching
 Mathematics, especially arithmetic and algebra
 Mechanics
 Mathematical physics
 Mathematics, especially analysis
 Astronomy and theory of errors
 Mathematics, especially geometry
 Applied mathematics, especially geodesy and geophysics.

Honorees 
The fifteen honorees between 1914 and 1941 are:
 1914: Felix Klein
 1916: Ernst Zermelo, prize of 1,000 marks
 1918: Ludwig Prandtl
 1920: Gustav Mie 
 1922: Paul Koebe
 1924: Arnold Kohlschütter
 1926: Wilhelm Blaschke
 1928: Albert Defant
 1930: Johannes Tropfke
 1932: Emmy Noether and Emil Artin, co-honorees
 1934: Erich Trefftz(de)
 1937: Pascual Jordan
 1938: Erich Hecke
 1941: Paul ten Bruggencate

Jurists 
In 1937, Constantin Carathéodory and Erhard Schmidt were invited to jury the award.  Along with Wilhelm Blaschke, Carathéodory was invited again in 1944 by the German Union of Mathematicians.

See also 
 List of mathematics awards

References 

Mathematics awards
Awards established in 1912
Leipzig University
Awards disestablished in the 1940s
1912 establishments in Germany